The University of North Carolina at Wilmington Arboretum, also known as the UNCW Arboretum, is an arboretum being developed on the University of North Carolina at Wilmington campus in Wilmington, North Carolina.

The arboretum was established in 1991, with a master plan drawn up in 1997.

See also 
 List of botanical gardens in the United States

External links 
 University of North Carolina at Wilmington Arboretum

Botanical gardens in North Carolina
Protected areas of New Hanover County, North Carolina